Licán Airport is an airstrip  east-northeast of Entre Lagos, a town in the Los Lagos Region of Chile. The airstrip is on the small delta of the Licán River on the north shore of Lake Puyehue.

See also

Transport in Chile
List of airports in Chile

References

External links
OpenStreetMap - Licán
OurAirports - Licán
FallingRain - Licán Airport

 

Airports in Chile
Airports in Los Lagos Region